Islamic dietary laws are dietary laws that Muslims follow. The dietary laws are found in the Quran, the holy book of Islam, as well as in collections of traditions attributed to Islamic prophet Muhammad.

Herbivores, cud-chewing animals like cattle, deer, sheep, goats, and antelope, are some examples of animals that are halal only if they are treated like sentient beings and slaughtered painlessly while reciting the Bismillah and Takbir. If the animal is treated poorly or tortured while being slaughtered, the meat is haram. Forbidden food substances include alcohol, pork, carrion, the meat of carnivores and animals that died due to illness, injury, stunning, poisoning, or slaughtering not in the name of God.

Regulations of food

Halal (permissible, lawful)
Quranic verses which have information regarding halal foods include: Q2:173, Q5:5, and Q6:118–119, 121.

Permissible meats and animals

Livestock or cattle, i.e. grazing beasts, are lawful except those that are explicitly prohibited. However, hunting is prohibited during "the pilgrimage" (Quran 5:1).

This means that most herbivores or cud-chewing animals like cattle, deer, sheep, goats, and antelope are considered halal to consume.

Animals hunted by trained birds and animals are also permitted according to the Quran 5:4.

Permitted method of slaughter

In Islamic law,  is the prescribed method of slaughter for halal animals. It consists of a swift, deep incision to the throat with a very sharp knife, cutting the wind pipe, jugular veins and carotid arteries on both sides but leaving the spinal cord intact.

The carcass should be hung upside down for long enough to be free of blood.

Slaughtered animals must be acknowledged as sentient beings and slaughtered painlessly while reciting the Bismillah and Takbir. The butcher is required to call upon the name of Allah" (Bismillah) individually for each animal. If the animal is treated poorly, or tortured while being slaughtered, the meat is haram.

Conversely, animals slaughtered for food may not be killed by being boiled or electrocuted. Animals strangled or beaten to death, or which died by falling or due to a wild animal are also expressly forbidden in the Qur'an 5:3.

Game of Sea

Game of water, i.e. fish and other sea creatures, is generally permitted in most of the schools of Islam based on their interpretation of the Quran 5:96. However, the Hanafi school of Islamic jurisprudence forbids consumption of seafood other than "fish" and considers other sea food such as Crustacean makruh. Fishing is permitted during pilgrimage.

Scholars disagree about whether prawns/shrimp are "fish", but in agreement that crocodiles, crabs, lobsters, and mollusks are not. al-Fatawa al-Hindiyya, 5/289–291, Bada’i al-Sana’i, 5/35–39 and Radd al-Muhtar, 304–308.

In Shia hadith there is also a prohibition on eating eels.

Food of People of the book
Food of Jews and Christians (other than those explicitly forbidden) is lawful for Muslims.

Haram (forbidden)
A variety of substances are also considered as unlawful (haram) for humans to consume and, therefore, forbidden.

Certain animals are considered haram, including land animals without blood, including all insects except locusts. Surah al-A’raf, V: 157; Sunan Abu Dawud, no: 3806. Most reptiles are also considered haram, as well as most pests (hasharat al-Ardh) such as mice and rats. Surah al-A’raf, V: 157.

Differences of opinion exist as to whether the consumption of horses, mules, and donkeys is permitted. In the Quran, one finds this verse: "And (He has created) horses, mules, and donkeys, for you to ride and use for show; and He has created (other) things of which you have no knowledge." Surah al-Nahl, V: 8. Which some scholars have interpreted as limiting these animals for riding and show and not permitting their consumption. Musnad Ahmad, 4/89, Sunan Abu Dawud, no: 3790, Sunan Nasa’i and Sunan Ibn Majah; Sahih al-Bukhari, no: 5202, 5205, and 5208. Predatory animals, such as lions and tigers, and birds of prey, such as falcons and hawks are forbidden to consume. Sahih Muslim, no: 1934.

However, a person would not be guilty of sin in a situation where the lack of any alternative creates an undesired necessity to consume that which is otherwise unlawful.

Intoxicants

Alcoholic drinks are generally prohibited in Islamic thought, with the Quran including several verses that admonish the consumption of khamr, an Arabic term meaning intoxicants that is interpreted to include most forms of alcohol and psychoactive drugs:

There is some debate about whether the prohibition extends to dishes in which the alcohol would be cooked off or if it would be practically impossible to consume enough of the food to become intoxicated.

Substances which contain intoxicants but are not consumed are not prohibited as such. For example, alcohol can be used as a disinfectant or for cleaning.

The Alevi Muslims of Turkey permit alcohol, unlike many other denominations. The Zaidi and Mutazili sects believe that the use of alcohol has always been forbidden and refer to the Qur'an Ayah (4:43) as feeling of sleepiness and not to be awake.

Carrion
An animal which dies by itself i.e., carrion

Blood
Blood and its by-products are forbidden in Islam, in the Quran, surah 5, al-Maʼidah, verse 3: also and its by-products are forbidden in Islam, in the Quran, surah 5, al-Maʼidah, verse 3:

Pork

Consumption of pork and products made from pork is strictly forbidden in Islam. The origin of this prohibition is in Surat al-Baqarah:

Animals dedicated to other than God
Animal dedicated to or slaughtered in the name of a human being or saint is prohibited.

Horses, mules and donkeys
In both Sunni and Shia hadith the meat of mules is prohibited but horse meat is allowed in Sunni sources. 

Horse meat is especially popular among the Muslims of Central Asia, due in part to their nomadic heritage.

According to Shia hadith the use of horses for food is prohibited.

Donkey meat is prohibited according to one hadith.

Animals with fangs
Predator animals possessing fangs are prohibited (e.g. cats, dogs, bears, lions, wolves).

Birds of prey
Birds having talons are prohibited (e.g. owls, eagles, hawks).

Other prohibited animals
Lizard is prohibited.

Likewise snakes, scorpion, and mice are prohibited.

Eating monkeys is prohibited in Islam. According to Shia hadith metamorphosed animals to which a disobedient, irreverent, or arrogant pre-Islamic nation was converted as a punishment, such as (apes and monkeys) are prohibited.

Islamic dietary laws during Ramadan
Ramadan, the ninth month on the Muslim calendar, is considered the holy month of fasting. Ramadan begins and ends with the appearance of the new moon. During the month of Ramadan, God delivered the Quran to the prophet Muhammad as guidance for the people. During Ramadan, Muslims take time for introspection, prayer, and reading of the Quran. For those who observe Ramadan with fasting, prayer, and faithful intention; God forgives their past sins. During this period, Muslims focus on self restraint or sawm (Arabic: to refrain) which is one of the five pillars of Islam. Ramadan emphasizes sawm, when worshippers have to abstain from food, drink, sexual activity, and immoral behavior between dawn and dusk. After dusk, Muslims break their fast during a meal called iftar with family and friends. Sawm can be negated by breaking fast, however, the lost can be made up with one extra day of fasting. The end of the Ramadan fast is the celebration of Eid-al-Fitr (Feast of Fast-Breaking), one of the two major religious holidays on the Muslim calendar.

Food certification

Since the turn of the 21st century, there have been efforts to create organizations that certify food products as halal for Muslim consumers in the USA. 
Since 1991, some mainstream manufacturers of soups, grains, cosmetics, pharmaceuticals, prepared foods, and other products, as well as hotels, restaurants, airlines, hospitals, and other service providers have pursued the halal market. These companies purchase halal-certified products. This can allow companies to export products to most Middle Eastern countries and Southeast Asian countries. The oldest and most well-known halal certifier in the United States is called the Islamic Services of America.

In Europe, several organizations have been created over the past twenty years in order to certify the halal products. A survey recently published by a French association of Muslim Consumers (ASIDCOM) shows that the market of halal products has been developed in a chaotic way in Europe. The European certification organizations do not have a common definition of "halal" nor agreed upon control procedures and traceability. The controls implemented by individual agencies are all very different: they can go from an annual audit of the slaughterhouse, to checking each production with permanent controls in place and on-going independent monitoring.

In South Africa, most chicken products have a halal stamp. The South African National Halal Authority (SANHA) issues certificates and products bearing this logo range from water, snacks, and even meat-free products (which may contain non-halal ingredients). The South African National Halal Authority also licenses the usage of the Halal logo in restaurants where the food is halal, in addition to no alcohol or pork products being served.

In Singapore, halal certification is managed by Majlis Ugama Islam Singapura (MUIS), also known as the Islamic Religious Council of Singapore. They are the sole custodian of Halal Certification in Singapore.

In Malaysia, the Department of Islamic Development Malaysia (JAKIM) is the agency responsible for halal certification in Malaysia.

Availability of halal food in non-Islamic regions

Many apparently meat-free dishes, and even some desserts, contain pork, such as most kinds of gelatin, or other non-conforming substances. There is some disagreement about food additives such as monosodium glutamate (MSG) that may use enzymes derived from pig fat in the production process. It is difficult to avoid such additives when eating out since they are usually not listed on restaurant menus. Some Muslim organizations compile tables of such additives. 

The halal market is now estimated to be 26% of world food trade and is growing. Companies from Europe and North America that would like to access the growing Halal market must get their consumable products Halal certified. The Global Halal Institute has a list of Halal certifiers that are approved by most Muslim countries with dietary import restrictions.

Americas
The first USDA approved Halal Food Company in the USA is Midamar Corporation. The company began producing halal beef, chicken, lamb and turkey products for domestic and international consumption in 1974 and is based in Cedar Rapids, Iowa which is home to one of the oldest Muslim communities in America and the longest standing mosque in America. In Dearborn, Michigan, the home of one of the largest Muslim and Arab populations in the United States, some fast-food restaurant chains such as the McDonald's Corporation have introduced halal chicken nuggets and chicken sandwiches.

Europe and Asia
In the United Kingdom, China, Indonesia, Malaysia, or Singapore, halal fried chicken restaurants having thousands of outlets, some but not all of which, serve halal foods such as the Kentucky Fried Chicken, Nando's, Brown's Chicken, and Crown Fried Chicken companies. In Arab, North African and Middle Eastern countries meat and food is mostly halal, even from foreign fast food chains.

Benefits 
The halal way of slaughter has been considered to be healthier and more hygienic. Research claims the method of quickly severing windpipe, jugular vein and carotid artery in one quick move without giving the animal time to panic does have an effect on quality of meat. When animals face trauma or stress the glycogen in their body is converted to lactic acid. This affects the pH level of the meat, lower pH resulting in lighter coloured meat and higher pH resulting in darker meat. This makes the meat tougher and also hard to chew. The halal way of slaughtering ensures the method is virtually less traumatic for the animal. According to the Humane Society Institute for Science and Policy, in a 1980 study on the effects of stress on livestock and meat quality, it was found that stunning creates more anxiety due to the stress experienced between the stunning and the bleed out of the animal. The halal slaughter method does not encounter this, as the swipe of the knife directly correlates to the loss of blood supply.

“By cutting the windpipe and the carotid artery, the flow of blood to the nerve in the brain that causes the sensation of pain, is stopped,” says Mufti Obaidullah Qasmi, former teacher at Darul Uloom, Deoband, India. “This leads to reduced pain.” The animal may appear to struggle and kick but that is due to the contraction and relaxation of muscles deficient in blood rather than pain.

In addition, draining out all the blood post slaughter produces softer meat. Blood left in could clot and cause the meat to spoil faster and harbour growth of microorganisms.

See also

 Comparison of Islamic and Jewish dietary laws
 Christian dietary laws
 Dhabihah
 Dietary laws
 Halal
 Hechsher
 Kashrut
 Kosher foods
 List of diets
 Makruh
 Mushbooh
 Muslim Consumer Group (MCG)
 Religious restrictions on the consumption of pork
 Ritual slaughter
 Taboo food and drink
 Word of Wisdom

References

External links
 Halal Adviser - Halal & Haram Guide
 Laws of Islam concerning food
 Is conventional meat Halal/Zabiha? Green Zabiha
 List of Haram and Doubtful Ingredients
 Learn More: Halal Knowledge Centre 

Diets
Food law
Halal food
Religion-based diets
Sharia